South West Aviation Co. Ltd. is a passenger and cargo airline based in Juba, South Sudan.

Incidents and accidents
On 22 August 2020, an Antonov An-26 operating a cargo flight from Juba to Aweil, South Sudan, crashed upon take-off, killing 17.

References

Airlines of South Sudan
Airlines established in 2017
2017 establishments in South Sudan